Kahani Raima Aur Manahil Ki is a Pakistani drama that premiered on Hum TV on 25 February 2014. It stars Sajjal Ali, Mehreen Syed, Vasay Chaudhry, and Shehroz Sabzwari as its main characters. The drama follows two couples; the first couple hates each other while the second couple loves each other.

Plot

The story revolves around two couples. The first couple is Wamaj and Raima, who have been married for eight years, and although they hate each other, they cannot divorce due to the wills left by their fathers. The second couple is Abrar and Manahil, who love each other but cannot marry due to financial problems. Abrar works at Raima's boutique while Manahil is Wamaj's secretary.

Episodes 1–5
Manahil and Abrar want to marry each other as soon as possible, but they cannot due to Abrar's elder sister Seher, who is not yet married but wants to find a husband as she passing a suitable age for marriage. Manahil tries to match Seher with an old shopkeeper (Rasheed), but fails, as Abrar sees the shopkeeper and Seher together. Manahil and Seher become good friends, which results in Manahil advising Seher so she can get married soon.

Raima and Wamaj have been married for the past eight years but hate each other. They cannot divorce each other because the one who files for divorce will not be part of the will signed by their parents. They unsuccessfully try to use black magic to get a divorce.

Episodes 6–8
A marriage proposal comes for Seher and she accepts. Raima and Wamaj continue to try make the other file for divorce by faking interest in another person. While Raima takes her friend Numra's husband for lunch, Wamaj starts flirting with a woman who ends up robbing him. When Numra sees her husband having dinner with Raima, she gets angry since she is not aware that Raima only pretends to be interested in her husband. Numra advises Raima to date another guy from her boutique, while Wamaj's friend tells him to date someone from his office. Raima tries to date Abrar and tells him that she just wants herself to be divorced, which he refuses, while Wamaj asks Manahil to be his date, who angrily rejects the invitation.

Manahil unsuccessfully asks her mother if she is allowed to marry Abrar. Her mother tells her that she will only let her marry him four years later, when her sibling is mature enough to earn. Manahil and Abrar are depressed and have no choice but to accept their bosses.

Abrar tells Manahil that he will work for Raima to get more money for Seher's wedding. Manahil tells him that if she works for Wamaj she can get more money to finance their marriage.

Episode 9–12
Raima and Wamaj are plan on making each other feel jealous: Wamaj invites Manahil to his house, and Raima spends a day with Abrar.

Abrar's mother, Zainab, wants him to marry someone. She invites people bringing a marriage proposal, whom are all rejected by Abrar. Manahil goes to Wamaj's house and tries to make Raima jealous by showing her that she cares a lot for Wamaj, but Raima is not fooled. Wamaj feels the same when Raima receives flowers and goes out with Abrar.

Seher's husband sees Abrar with Raima and tells her about his affair, Seher asks Abrar about this and he says that he treats Raima as his sister. Manahil's mother, Asiya, is suspicious about her daughter and spies on her. She sees Manahil with Wamaj and thinks that both are having a love affair. She takes her home and tells her that she should marry Wamaj. When Wamaj takes a fake marriage proposal to her house and lies to Asiya that he is around 80 years and was married to a woman before, Asiya rejects this proposal.

After looking at Raima's wealth, Seher tells Zainab about her and tells her that through her they can be rich. Zainab then invites Raima to her house and Seher and Zainab treat Raima like a family member, which annoys Raima.

Episode 13–17
Seher wants Raima to marry her brother-in-law Khudbudeen, whom Raima hates, though she cannot do anything. Asiya wants Manahil to marry Wahaj, and Raima tells her that she is completely okay with the marriage, Zainab thinks that Asiya is interested in Wamaj.

Raima thinks that Abrar is useless and making him work with her is a waste of time and she tells Abrar to quit, Wamaj thinks the same of Manahil and tells her to quit.

Asiya does not tell her daughter to marry Wamaj, and Manahil and Abrar lose their jobs. Khudbudeen tells Seher and Zainab that Abrar has married Raima.

Raima and Wamaj later receive an invitation to their uncle's daughter's marriage, and when they return Raima is shot. Wamaj takes care of her in the hospital, and Raima falls in love with him.

After Abrar is forgiven, Seher and Zainab believe he is telling the truth. Manahil finally tells Asiya that she is not in love with Wamaj and she was only working for him. Seher's husband starts blaming her, saying that her brother is a spoiled boy and refuses to talk to her.

Manahil and Abrar are not talking to each other while Raima and Wamaj have fallen deeply in love. Raima's friend, Numra, tells her that Wahaj is acting like a good man, but in reality just wants her to divorce him. Wahaj's friend tells him something similar. Raima tells Abrar to work for Wahaj by bringing her and Wahaj close, and tells him that Manahil is a fraud and only loves his money, Wahaj tells Manahil the same thing, but both refuse.

Episode 18
Because of their jobs, Manahil and Abrar are not talking with each other. After asking Abrar for help, Raima orders Abrar to tell Wahaj that Manahil has a bad reputation. The same plot is being concocted by Wahaj, which Manahil agrees to carry out.

At the park, Manahil and Abrar see each other and both become depressed.

At Manahil's house, Seher and Zainab discuss Manahil and Abrar's marriage proposal. Both families agree to it. Asiya tells her the news, but refuses when she finds out her intended spouse is Abrar.

When Manahil and Abrar meet face to face they get into an argument.

Episode 19
Wahaj talks to his friend and says that would do anything to get Raima back and kill Abrar. His friend calms him down and tells him to be patient. The next morning Raima goes to Manahil's home and humiliates her while standing at the front gate. Manahil tries to tell her the truth, but Raima refuses to listen. After the two bicker, Raima leaves. The next day, Wahaj pays a gang some money to beat Abrar but not badly. After being attacked, Abrar tells the whole story to Zainab and Seher, and tells them that Manahil is responsible. Meanwhile, Manahil tells Asiya about how Abrar that is in love with Raima.  Asiya gets very angry and starts hating Abrar.

The next day, Manahil and Abrar's families are shout at and fight each other. Wahaj talks to his lawyer to arrange divorce papers. Two months later, Raima tells Numra that she loves Wahaj madly, but she will only be happy when he is. She thinks this can only happen by him marrying Manahil.

The next morning Wahaj tells Raima to sign the divorce papers. They learn about each other's plan for making the other jealous and laugh. The next morning Wahaj and Raima enjoy breakfast together. They talk about Abrar and Manahil, and how their relationship is damaged because of them. Wahaj  and Raima try to talk to Abrar and Manahil respectively, but are both ignored.

Episode 20 (last episode)
Wahaj and Raima are both still worried about Manahil and Abrar. Asiya organises Manahil's wedding to an unknown man. Wahaj invites Manahil to a park to resolve all the misunderstandings. Manahil sees Abrar and they both start fighting when Raima and Wahaj stop them, tell them everything, and ask that the four of them discuss problems.

Manahil goes home and asks her mom Asiya that both of them should consult a priest before their marriage. Wahaj arranges a fake priest who tells them that the person whom Manahil would wed has a supernatural ghost problem so Asiya calls them and cancels the marriage. The next day, Raima and Wamaj take a marriage proposal to Manahil from Abrar. Seher reminds Manahil that she once promised her that she will bring her to her home as Abrar's wife and tells her that now her promise is being fulfilled.

Soundtrack

The soundtrack is composed by Sohail Keys. It is sung by Dua Malik and Natasha Baig, and the guitars are done by Abid Wilson. The title song video is done by Sajal Ali and Mehreen Raheel.

Production

Kahani Raima Aur Manahil Ki is produced by Afzal Ali, written by Faiza Iftikhar, and directed by Fahim Burney. The series' original soundtrack is performed by Dua Malik and Natasha Baig, and composed by Sohail Keys. The series is a Mushroom Production Project which stars Sajjal Ali, Mehreen Syed, Vasay Chaudhary, and Shehroz Sabzwari. The show first aired on 25 February 2014 on Channel Hum TV and was scheduled on Tuesdays at 9:10pm. The show ended after 18 episodes, but two more episodes were aired before the show ended on 20 August 2014.

Cast

 Mehreen Raheel
 Shehroz Sabzwari
 Sajal Ali
 Shaheen Khan as Bunty's mother
 Vasay Chaudhry 
 Ahmed Ali Butt 
 Irfan Khoosat
 Saima Naz
 Hira But
Komal But
Abid Hussain
Arsalan Chaudhary
Anis Alim
Imran Khan
Zahida Batool
Sajid Rafi
Imra
Rida
Inayat Ali
Tanzeel
Saima
Abid
Zainab
Saba Pirzada
Rohan Raja

References

External links
 Official website
 
 kahani raima aur manahil ki on HUMNetwork

 

2014 Pakistani television series debuts
2014 Pakistani television series endings
Hum TV original programming
Pakistani drama television series
Urdu-language television shows